National Highway 147, commonly referred to as NH 147 is a national highway in  India. Sarkhej–Gandhinagar Highway is part of national highway 147.

Route 

Sarkhej - Gandhinagar - Chilloda.

Junctions  

  Terminal near Sarkhej.
 Cloverleaf interchange with SH41 near Adalaj
  Terminal near Chilloda.

See also 

 List of National Highways in India
 List of National Highways in India by state

References

External links 

 NH 147 on OpenStreetMap

National highways in India
National Highways in Gujarat
Transport in Ahmedabad
Transport in Gandhinagar